Micrixalus specca is a species of frogs in the family Micrixalidae.
It is endemic to the Western Ghats, India.

Its natural habitats are subtropical or tropical moist lowland forest and rivers.

References

External links

Micrixalus
Endemic fauna of the Western Ghats
Frogs of India
Amphibians described in 2014
Taxa named by Sathyabhama Das Biju